Tetiana Tarasova (born 8 November 1957) is a Ukrainian speed skater. She competed in the women's 500 metres at the 1980 Winter Olympics, representing the Soviet Union.

References

1957 births
Living people
Ukrainian female speed skaters
Olympic speed skaters of the Soviet Union
Speed skaters at the 1980 Winter Olympics
Sportspeople from Astana